In optics, a tophat (or top-hat) beam such as a laser beam or electron beam has a near-uniform fluence (energy density) within a circular disk. It is typically formed by diffractive optical elements from a Gaussian beam. Tophat beams are often used in industry, for example for laser drilling of holes in printed circuit boards. They are also used in very high power laser systems, which use chains of optical amplifiers to produce an intense beam. Tophat beams are named for their resemblance to the shape of a top hat.

External links
 Video of propagation simulation of TopHat Diffractive Optical Element around focal plane by Holo/Or
 Flat top / Beam shaping application notes - Diffractive optics by HoloOr
 MATLAB function for simulating TopHat beam by HoloOr

See also
Laser beam profiler
Bessel beam

Laser science